Oncidium ornithorhynchum is a species of orchid found from Mexico to Colombia.

ornithorhynchum
Orchids of Central America
Orchids of Colombia
Orchids of Mexico